Strome may refer to:

People 
Sue Black, Baroness Black of Strome,  Scottish forensic anthropologist
Jennifer Strome, producer and writer
Dylan Strome (born 1997), Canadian ice hockey player
Mark Strome, American businessman
Ryan Strome (born 1993), Canadian ice hockey player
Steve Strome, former head men’s tennis coach at Miami University, Louisiana State University
 (born 1981), Canadian ice hockey player

Places 
Strome, Alberta, village in East Central Alberta, Canada
Strome Castle, ruined castle on the shore of Loch Carron in Stromemore on the west coast of the Scottish Highlands
Strome Park, Lincoln County Park in Coastal Oregon, USA

See also
Land der Berge, Land am Strome (Land of the mountains, land on the river), the national anthem of Austria
Lava-Ströme (Streams of Lava), the name of a waltz composed by Johann Strauss II
Stromae (born 1985), Belgian musician